Sharifabad (also Romanized as Sharīfābād) is a village in the Kalat-e Hay-ye Sharqi Rural District in the Central District of Meyami County, Semnan Province, Iran. According to the 2006 census, its population was 210 people from 47 families.

References 

Populated places in Meyami County